Henry Albert Rockwell (February 10, 1917 – November 30, 1997) was an American football player. He played college football for Arizona State University and professional football in the National Football League (NFL) as a guard for the Cleveland Rams (1940–1942). He appeared in 55 NFL and AAFC games, 11 as a starter.

References

1917 births
1997 deaths
American football guards
Sportspeople from Whittier, California
Arizona State Sun Devils football players
Cleveland Rams players
Los Angeles Dons players
Players of American football from California